Bumbunga is a locality in the Mid North of South Australia  north of Adelaide.

According to anthropologist Norman Tindale the name was derives from parnpangka, the local indigenous (Kaurna) term for 'rain water lake', referring to Lake Bumbunga.

The town administration falls under the control of the Wakefield Regional Council for local governance. Bumbunga lies in the state electoral district of Narungga and in the federal electoral division of Grey.

The South Australian Government's Atlas of South Australia describes the Bumbunga environmental subregion as being a low-lying (mean altitude  alluvial plains "with salt lakes and occasional dunes." The atlas further describes the subregion as having "grassland cover used for rotation cereal cultivation and livestock grazing" and "low shrubland used for livestock grazing" on salt lake margins.

Located on what was traditionally the land of the Kaurna (indigenous) people, the first pioneers arrived sometime between 1847 and 1849 due to the rapid expansion of farming to the north of the area. This farmland, according to the publication, contained the farming stations of Barunga, Bumbunga and Wokurna and consisted of "salt lakes and lagoons, dense scrub, with mallee, pine and bushes, grassy plains and saltbush, well grassed spurs and hills, with oaks and wattle on the Broughton River."

A secessionist micronation, the Province of Bumbunga, was located in Bumbunga for approximately a decade in the 1970s and 1980s.

The Bumbunga railway siding of the Port Pirie railway line was established in the early 1920s during the extension of the main line from Long Plains to Redhill. In 1926, a  spur line was completed from the siding to Lochiel salt works on the south-western shore of Lake Bumbunga.

Salt Lake
About 1905 a hamlet called Salt Lake existed on Salt Lake Road, the present-day boundary between Bumbunga and Snowtown 750 metres (800 yards) north of Lake Bumbunga.

References

External links
 Local salt mining
 Snowtown Museum

Towns in South Australia